One Bullet Away: The Making of a Marine Officer is an autobiography by Nathaniel Fick, published by Houghton-Mifflin in 2005. An account of Nathaniel Fick's time in the United States Marine Corps, it begins with his experiences at Officer Candidate's School in Quantico, Virginia and details his deployments to Afghanistan and Iraq during the War on Terror.

In 2006, Recorded Books published an unabridged audiobook edition, narrated by Andy Paris.

Awards
Nathaniel Fick received the Colby Award for One Bullet Away in 2006.

References

External links
After Words interview with Fick on One Bullet Away, November 19, 2005

2005 non-fiction books
Military books
Iraq War books
Books about the 2003 invasion of Iraq
Non-fiction books about the United States Marine Corps
American memoirs